Carboxypeptidase A4 is an enzyme that in humans is encoded by the CPA4 gene.

This gene is a member of the carboxypeptidase A/B subfamily, and it is located in a cluster with three other family members on chromosome 7. Carboxypeptidases are zinc-containing exopeptidases that catalyze the release of carboxy-terminal amino acids, and are synthesized as zymogens that are activated by proteolytic cleavage. This gene could be involved in the histone hyperacetylation pathway. It is imprinted and may be a strong candidate gene for prostate cancer aggressiveness.

References

External links

Further reading